Jean Ray may refer to:

Jean Ray (author) (1887–1964), pseudonym of a Belgian writer
Jean Ray of Jim and Jean, an early-mid-1960s folk music duo

See also
Jean Rey (disambiguation)
Jean Ray Laury (1928–2011), quiltmaker
Dorothy Jean Ray (1919–2007), historian of folk art